HMCS Annapolis was an  that served in the Royal Canadian Navy and later, the Canadian Forces.  She was the second Canadian naval unit to carry this name. Named for the Annapolis River that flows through Nova Scotia, the ship entered service in 1964, the last of the  design. Serving through the Cold War, Annapolis was decommissioned in 1998 before going through a protracted legal battle for use as an artificial reef. She was finally scuttled as such in 2015 off the coast of British Columbia.

Design and description

Initially, the ships displaced  and had a complement of 228.

The ships were powered by two Babcock & Wilcox boilers connected to the two-shaft English-Electric geared steam turbines providing .

The ships were initially armed with two /50 caliber dual-purpose guns mounted in a single turret forward. The extra topweight of the helicopter required the return of the American Mk 33 3-inch gun over the heavier 3-inch/70 caliber guns used on the preceding class. The guns could fire 45 – 50 rounds per minute with a lifespan of 2,050 rounds. The guns were placed in a Mk 33 mount. The mounting allowed the guns to elevate from −15° to 85°. The elevation rate was 30° per second and train rate was 24° per second. The mounts could train 360°.

For anti-submarine warfare, the ships were armed with a Mk 10 Limbo mortar. Placed on stabilized mountings, the projectiles always entered the water at the same angle. They also had a Mk.4 thrower with homing torpedoes.

Initially the ships were outfitted with one SPS-12 air search radar, one SPS-10B surface search radar, and one Sperry Mk.2 navigation radar. For sensing below the surface, the class was given one SQS-501 high frequency bottom profiler sonar, one SQS-502 high frequency mortar control sonar, one SQS-503 hull mounted active search sonar and one SQS-504 VDS medium frequency active search sonar. For fire control purposes they were given one Mk 64 GFCS fire control with SPG-48 tracker (GUNAR).

The two Annapolis-class destroyers were built late enough to incorporate the helicopter hangar retrofitted to the St. Laurent class and the "Beartrap" haul-down device. This allowed the destroyer escorts to deploy with one CH-124 Sea King helicopter.

DELEX refit
The DEstroyer Life EXtension (DELEX) refit was born out of the need to extend the life of the steam-powered destroyer escorts of the Canadian Navy in the 1980s until the next generation of surface ship was built. Encompassing all the classes based on the initial St. Laurent (the remaining St. Laurent, Mackenzie, and Annapolis-class vessels), the DELEX upgrades were meant to improve their ability to combat modern Soviet submarines, and to allow them to continue to operate as part of NATO task forces.

The Annapolis class received the same sensor and communications upgrades that others in the St Laurent family of ships received, including the installation of a new tactical data system (ADLIPS), updated radars and sonars, fire control and satellite navigation. They also received the new Canadian Tactical Towed Array Sensor or CANTASS which was a long-range towed sonar array that was affixed to the stern, which replaced the older VDS. The class also received a new lattice mast.

They were given  torpedo tubes to allow them to fire Mark 46 torpedoes. However, the Limbo mortar was removed in order to install the CANTASS. This visibly altered the overall appearance of the ships.

Service history
Annapolis was ordered in 1958, initially as a repeat Restigouche-class vessel. However in 1959, the last two repeat Restigouches were altered to incorporate variable depth sonar and a helicopter landing area. The ship was laid down on 2 September 1961 by Halifax Shipyards Ltd. at Halifax. Christened by Mrs. Miriam Nowlan, wife of George Nowlan M.P. for  Digby—Annapolis—Kings three days before the ship's launch on 27 April 1963, Annapolis was commissioned into the Royal Canadian Navy on 19 December 1964 with the classification number 265.

Annapolis served first with Maritime Forces Atlantic (MARLANT) and later with Maritime Forces Pacific (MARPAC). In 1965, Annapolis, while serving with MARLANT, Annapolis was ordered to the Dominican Republic as a show of Canadian support for the American intervention there. In 1970, Annapolis, with the destroyer  and the replenishment ship , participated in Manitoba's centennial celebrations, making port visits at Churchill, Rankin Inlet, Chesterfield Inlet and Wakeham Bay. Annapolis served as flagship in 1974 of STANAVFORLANT, the standing NATO fleet. In June, Annapolis rescued the crew of a Sea King helicopter which had ditched into the sea while attempting to land on the frigate . Annapolis later recovered the helicopter. In December, Annapolis boarded five Soviet fishing vessels in the Atlantic believing them to be illegally fishing. The ship later released them.

Annapolis underwent the DELEX refit from 19 August 1985 to 8 January 1987 at the Saint John Shipbuilding yards in Saint John, New Brunswick. Following completion of the refit, Annapolis took part in the large NATO naval exercise, Ocean Safari '87 and in Fall 1987, escorted the royal yacht  on the Great Lakes. In the late 1980s, she was used as the trial ship for the CANTASS towed sonar array system.

On 14 August 1989, Annapolis transferred to the Pacific coast, joining MARPAC. She arrived at Esquimalt, British Columbia on 25 September. From 3–7 June 1990, Annapolis was a Canadian task group that visited Vladivostok, Russia. In 1994, the destroyer was deployed as part of Operation Forward Action, the Canadian participation in the United Nations-sanctioned blockade of Haiti that year. She arrived off Haiti on 25 March and on 12 April, suffered an explosion in her port boiler. She remained on station for a further 30 days before returning to Esquimalt. The ship was removed from active service from Maritime Command on 15 November 1996 and placed in reserve. She was paid off on 1 July 1998 and stripped of all weapons and sensors before being laid up at CFB Esquimalt.

Sale for artificial reef
Annapolis was sold to the Artificial Reef Society of British Columbia (ARSBC) in 2008. She was sunk, after some years of legal disputes over environmental concerns, as an artificial reef and long-term marine habitat in Halkett Bay Provincial Park off Gambier Island in Howe Sound on 4 April 2015.

References

Notes

Citations

Sources

External links

Artificial Reef Society of British Columbia
Video of the scuttling of HMCS Annapolis in April 2015

Annapolis-class destroyers
Cold War destroyers of Canada
1963 ships
Ships built in Nova Scotia